Alberto Romea (16 January 1882 – 14 April 1960) was a Spanish actor. Romea appeared in more than fifty films during his career including Lola, the Coalgirl (1952).

Selected filmography
 Garrotazo y tentetieso (1914)
 The Lady from Trévelez (1936)
 A Woman in Danger (1936)
 Carmen (1938)
 Sons of the Night (1939)
 The Barber of Seville (1938)
 The Reluctant Hero (1941)
 Journey to Nowhere (1942)
 A Famous Gentleman (1943)
 Eloisa Is Under an Almond Tree (1943)
 The Phantom and Dona Juanita (1945)
 Thirsty Land  (1945)
 Mariona Rebull (1947)
 The Party Goes On (1948)
 The Sunless Street (1948)
 My Beloved Juan (1950)
 The Lioness of Castille (1951)
 Dawn of America (1951)
 Lola the Coalgirl (1952)
 I Was a Parish Priest (1953)
 History of the Radio (1955)

Theatre
 El orgullo de Albacete (1902), by Pierre Veber.
 Doña Clarines (1909), by Hermanos Álvarez Quintero.
 No somos nadie (1909), by Carlos Fernández Shaw.
 La losa de los sueños (1911), by Jacinto Benavente.
 Puebla de las Mujeres (1912), by Hermanos Álvarez Quintero.
 La propia estimación (1915), by Jacinto Benavente.
 La campana (1919), by Luis Fernández Ardavín.
 El abuelo (1920), by Benito Pérez Galdós.
 Los chatos (1924), by Pedro Muñoz Seca.
 Canción de cuna (1946), by Gregorio Martínez Sierra.
 Celos del aire (1950), de José López Rubio.

References

Bibliography 
 Mira, Alberto. The Cinema of Spain and Portugal. Wallflower Press, 2005.

External links 
 

1882 births
1960 deaths
Spanish male film actors
People from Madrid